Sydney Harold Jensen (13 November 1922 – 22 July 1999) was a Grand Prix motorcycle and auto racer from New Zealand.

Racing career
Jensen's best result in motorcycle racing was at the 1949 Isle of Man TT when he placed fifth in the Senior TT. He later moved to auto racing, finishing second to Bruce McLaren in the New Zealand Gold Star Championship in 1959. Jensen won the New Zealand Gold Star Championship in 1960.

Career statistics

By season

References

External links
 Profile on motogp.com

1922 births
1999 deaths
New Zealand motorcycle racers
500cc World Championship riders
350cc World Championship riders
Isle of Man TT riders
New Zealand racing drivers